A pin-back button or pinback button, pin button, button badge, or simply pin-back or badge, is a button or badge that can be temporarily fastened to the surface of a garment using a safety pin, or a pin formed from wire, a clutch or other mechanism. This fastening mechanism is anchored to the back side of a button-shaped metal disk, either flat or concave, which leaves an area on the front of the button to carry an image or printed message. The word is commonly associated with a campaign button used during a political campaign. The first design for a pin-back button in the United States was patented in 1896, and contemporary buttons have many of the same design features.

History

Buttons have been used around the world to allow people to personally promote/advertise their political affiliations.

In 1787 Josiah Wedgwood of the Wedgwood pottery dynasty ordered the production of the Wedgwood anti-slavery medallion to promote the British anti-slavery movement to the House of Commons. This is believed to be the first use of a slogan on a product and a forerunner of today's political campaign button. The original was a stamp for wax but the image was later reproduced by Wedgewood as a porcelain cameo.

In the United States since the first presidential inauguration in 1789, George Washington's supporters wore buttons imprinted with a slogan. These early buttons were sewn to the lapel of a coat or worn as a pendant on a string. Some of the earliest campaign buttons to feature photographs were produced to promote the political platform of Abraham Lincoln in 1860.

Benjamin S. Whitehead patented the first innovation to the design in 1893 by inserting a sheet of transparent film made of celluloid over a photograph mounted on a badge to protect the image from scratches and abrasion. Whitehead had patents for various designs of ornamental badges and medallions previously, patented as early as 1892. Another patent was issued to Whitehead & Hoag on 21 July 1896 for a "Badge Pin or Button" which used a metal pin anchored to the back of the button to fasten the badge.
My present invention has reference to improvements in badges for use as lapel pins or buttons, or other like uses, and has for its primary object to provide ... a novel means for connecting the ornamental shell or button to the bar or pin for securing the badge to the lapel of the coat.

Other improvements and modifications to the basic design were patented in the following years by other inventors.

Early pin-back buttons from 1898 were printed with a popular cartoon character, The Yellow Kid, and offered as prizes with chewing gum or tobacco products to increase sales.

These buttons were produced with a concave opening on the back side (which provided space to insert advertising), or with a closed back, filled with metal insert and fastener. These are called "open back" and "closed back" buttons.

In 1945, the Kellogg Company, the pioneer in cereal box prizes, inserted prizes in the form of pin-back buttons into each box of Pep Cereal.  Pep pins have included U.S. Army squadrons as well as characters from newspaper comics.  There were 5 series of comic characters and 18 different buttons in each set, with a total of 90 in the collection.

See also

Badge
Campaign button
Lapel pin
 Prizes
Promotional merchandise
 Safety pin

References

External links

 The Busy Beaver Button Museum
 Collection of United States Social Pinback Buttons. Yale Collection of Western Americana, Beinecke Rare Book and Manuscript Library.

Badges
Fashion accessories
Sales promotion
Collecting
Ephemera